Myakhu  is a village development committee in Udayapur District in the Sagarmatha Zone of south-eastern Nepal.

References

External links
UN map of the municipalities of Udayapur District

Populated places in Udayapur District